Teodora Mirčić and Marija Mirkovic were the defending champions, but both chose not to participate. 
Stéphanie Foretz Gacon and Tatjana Malek won the tournament by defeating Edina Gallovits-Hall and Andreja Klepač in the final 6–2, 7–5.

Seeds

Draw

Draw

References
 Main Draw

Bella Cup - Doubles